Martin Kenny (born 1 October 1971) is an Irish Sinn Féin politician who has been a Teachta Dála (TD) for the Sligo–Leitrim constituency since the 2016 general election.

Career 
Kenny became a member of Leitrim County Council in 2001, when he was co-opted to replace Liam McGirl, the son of former Sinn Féin TD John Joe McGirl.

Harassment and attacks 
In May 2016, Kenny alleged a number of serious instances of misconduct within the Garda Síochána. The main allegations included that gardaí were engaging informants who were active criminals, outside the Garda Covert Human Intelligence Sources programme. He also mentioned a number of instances including "robberies allegedly carried out by informants under the direction of gardaí", cases of entrapment made at the behest of Garda handlers, and an instance where "senior gardaí did not inform other members of the force of plans by a criminal gang to carry out attacks at the homes of gardaí".

He also stated that two Gardaí had brought this to the attention of both Martin Callinan (former Commissioner of the Garda Síochána) and the former Minister of Justice, Alan Shatter, but their concerns were ignored.

In October 2019, Kenny said he had received death threats after he spoke out in Dáil Eireann against far-right elements in Irish society using anti-immigrant rhetoric. Kenny's remarks were spurred by the aftermath of the 2019 Grays incident, and recent protests against the building of a Direct Provision centre in his own constituency in County Leitrim as well other protests in Ireland against the construction of Direct Provision centres. On 28 October 2019, Kenny's car was set ablaze outside his family home. In an interview with Ocean FM he described the arson attack as "traumatic" and feared that he was facing the same fate as Kevin Lunney.

In October 2021, a threat of gun violence was made to Kenny's office.

References

External links
Martin Kenny's page on the Sinn Féin website

1971 births
Living people
Local councillors in County Leitrim
Members of the 32nd Dáil
Members of the 33rd Dáil
Sinn Féin TDs (post-1923)
Alumni of the Institute of Technology, Sligo